Josef Bechyně (12 April 1880 – 1 August 1934) was a Czech wrestler. He competed in the men's Greco-Roman middleweight at the 1908 Summer Olympics, representing Bohemia.

References

1880 births
1934 deaths
Czech male sport wrestlers
Olympic wrestlers of Bohemia
Wrestlers at the 1908 Summer Olympics
Sportspeople from Prague
Sportspeople from the Austro-Hungarian Empire